Bruce Dinsmore (born November 22, 1965) is a Canadian voice actor. He voices Tubby Tompkins from The Little Lulu Show, Binky Barnes and David Read (Arthur, DW and Baby Kate's Dad) from Arthur, Rudolph the Red Nosed Reindeer from The Secret World of Santa Claus and Greens the Frog from Mumble Bumble on CINAR and  has contributed mocap/voice performances in numerous video games, notably as Paul Revere in Assassin's Creed III, Maximilien de Robespierre in Assassin's Creed: Unity and Bill Taggart in Deus Ex: Human Revolution.

Early life
Dinsmore is a graduate of the National Theatre School of Canada.

Career
He voices Binky Barnes and David Read in Arthur, Tubby Tompkins in The Little Lulu Show, Horace in Wimzie's House, Nathan in Kid Kidettes, and Jervis Coltrane and Mr. Hutchins in What's with Andy? seasons 2 and 3. He also voiced Bernie the Hermit Crab in H2O: Mermaid Adventures and Poe the Spider in Spookley the Square Pumpkin.

Dinsmore also did episodes of the YTV series Prank Patrol and starred in the film The Myth of the Male Orgasm.

Specifics on Arthur 
Dismore did an interview with the Arthur fan podcast "Elwood City Limits" in 2018 and spoke in-depth about his voice roles on that show. In particular he spoke about his role as Arthur's father: "I've really only started to feel comfortable doing Dad in the last three or four years." He said he had started voicing "Dad" when he was rather young and being older and having children in real life by 2018 he felt he has started to "earn that role".

In November 2018, Dinsmore revealed that he had finished recording the final episodes in advance, nearly four years before the show’s conclusion in 2022.

References

External links
 

Living people
Canadian voice directors
Canadian male film actors
Canadian male television actors
Canadian male voice actors
Arthur (TV series)
1965 births